C3 Racing is a racing game released in 1998 developed by Eutechnyx and published by Infogrames Multimedia for the PlayStation. The game allows the player to race in 11 locations around the world in a variety of sports cars. In each country there are three tracks to race on. The term C3 Racing stands for three C's; Car Constructors Championship.

The game was released in the UK as Max Power Racing as a tie-in to the Max Power magazine. In North America, the game was rethemed and renamed as TNN Motorsports Hardcore TR by publisher ASC Games, which featured different cars, but had similar tracks (relocated to locations within the United States) and menus to C3 Racing.

Gameplay
In Arcade mode the player races on all 31 tracks in the game, unlocking new and more powerful cars with every two victories. In the beginning of the game the player races in either Africa or Peru in either a Nissan Micra or a Renault Clio. These are separate tangents that unlock separate countries to each other.

If the player finishes first on all three tracks in Africa then they will unlock the Chinese tracks, and they finish first on those tracks then they will unlock the Indonesia tracks. From here, the USA tracks are unlocked followed by the Brazilian tracks. After unlocking the Brazilian tracks no more tracks can be unlocked in this tangent.

As for the Peru tangent, finishing 1st unlocks the Rome tracks, followed by Norway, Monaco and the United Kingdom. After unlocking all available GTI cars during the course of the Arcade Mode the choice of cars will change to High Performance Class, starting as with the GTI Class with two cars to choose from.

If the players have finished all the 31 tracks, they will be able to race on all the tracks reversed.

In Championship mode, the player races in four Championship classes, with pre-determined circuits for racing on.

1998 video games
Advergames
Europe-exclusive video games
Racing video games
Eutechnyx games
PlayStation (console) games
PlayStation (console)-only games
Video games developed in the United Kingdom
ASC Games games
Multiplayer and single-player video games